Good Shepherd Entertainment (formerly Gambitious Digital Entertainment) is a Dutch video game publisher based in Amsterdam. The company was founded in 2011 and opened its equity crowdfunding platform in September 2012. Gambitious' publishing label was opened in 2014, offering publishing services. In August 2017, Gambitious Digital Entertainment was rebranded Good Shepherd Entertainment whereas they ceased their crowdfunding activities and fully transitioned into being a publisher. Having been a consultant to the company prior,  Brian Grigsby now became the CEO of the company.

History

Foundation (2011–2012) 

Gambitious Digital Entertainment was established in 2011 by chief executive officer Paul Hanraets. Founding partners include Mike Wilson and Harry Miller of Devolver Digital, Sjoerd Geurts, and Andy Payne. Additional funding was provided by business funding platform Symbid. The company and its crowdfunding platform, also called Gambitious, were formally announced in February 2012. By June 2012, the company was headquartered in Amsterdam, Netherlands, with another office in Austin, Texas, United States. The shareholdings of Miller and Wilson, while independent from Devolver Digital, made for a controlling interest.

Crowdfunding (2012–2013) 
Gambitious' crowdfunding platform was opened on 25 September 2012. The platform was described as a hybrid crowd-finance platform and indie publishing label. The first product featured on Gambitious' platform was to be a sequel to Mushroom Men. The first game featured became Train Fever instead.

According to Wilson, the idea behind the company was to create "a platform that brings investors and developers together to create great games to their mutual benefit". In March 2013, Gambitious successfully closed their first equity-based crowdfunding campaign for Train Fever, which raised €250,000 from 640 international investors.

Gambitious also experimented by offering pledging as a funding option on their platform. This resulted in a successful funding for charity SpecialEffect, which raised 113% of it target aimed towards purchasing specialised computers for severely disabled gamers that can be controlled using eye movement.

Changes to crowdfunding (2015–2017) 
Due to international regulatory differences on the topic of equity-based crowdfunding, Gambitious was forced to restructure their model several times, leading to the eventual decision to officially separate from Symbid in February 2015 and transition into an independent game publisher. Between 2015 and 2017 Gambitious utilises an evolving set of crowd finance tools and techniques in order to fund their games. Whereby they rely on a private network of investors who invest alongside them under the same exact terms and conditions. In January 2016, Gambitious opened their network to new United States accredited and European investors. On 16 August 2017, Gambitious was rebranded as Good Shepherd Entertainment. and transitioned from a crowdfunding platform to a publisher collaborating with a private network of accredited investors upon request. The company also received a new investment by Advance/Newhouse, through which they opened new full-time positions. At this time, the company had 12 employees.

Indie game publishing (2013–present) 
Every game that Gambitious has signed on has been funded and released, with four of the first six titles delivering profits to investors in the first month following release. Gambitious had a core group of 30 investors.

In 2019, Good Shepherd Entertainment partnered with Lionsgate Games and announced John Wick Hex. Paul Hanraets stated that Good Shepherd intends to focus on triple-I games and similar licence-holder collaborations. According to Hanraets, the company has access to popular pop-culture IPs like John Wick, which it will pair with experienced indie developers.

In April 2019, Good Shepherd Entertainment acquired a majority stake in Artificer, a Warsaw based game development studio founded by the core team responsible for Hard West and Phantom Doctrine. Artificer consists of over 30 team-members who have previously worked on numerous titles including the Call of Juarez and the Dead Island series. 

Devolver Digital bought Good Shepherd on 7 January 2021.

Games

Games published

Games re-released

References

External links 
 

Companies based in Amsterdam
Video game companies established in 2011
Dutch companies established in 2011
Video game companies of the Netherlands
Video game publishers
2021 mergers and acquisitions